Rebrikhinsky District is an administrative and municipal district (raion), one of the fifty-nine in Altai Krai, Russia. It is located in the north of the krai. Its administrative center is the rural locality (a selo) of Rebrikha. As of the 2010 Census, the total population of the district was 24,559, with the population of Rebrikha accounting for 34.5% of that number.

Geography
Rebrikhinsky District is located in the north-central region of Altai Krail.  The terrain is relatively flat forest-steppe, with some ravines, on the Ob Plateau.  The soils are a variety of medium-humus chernozems, sandy areas in the ravines, and salt marshes. The main river through the district is the Kasmala, which flows from southwest to northeast through the district, ultimately joining the Ob River about 50 km to the northeast. The Kulunda runs parallel to the Kasmala, and forms the northern border of the district, while a third river, the Barnaulka, runs along the southern border.  

Rebrikhinsky District is 75 km west of the regional city of Barnaul, and 2,800 km southeast of Moscow.  The area measures 65 km (north-south), and 55 km (west-east); total area is 2,686 km2 (about 1.6% of Altai Krai).  The administrative center is the town of Rebrikha.

The district is bordered on the north by Shelabolikhinsky District, on the east by Pavlovsky District, on the south by Aleysky District, and on the west by Mamontovsky District.

References

Notes

Sources

External links
Rebrikhinsky District on Google Maps
Rebrikhinsky District on OpenStreetMap

Districts of Altai Krai